The Moneton were a historical Native American tribe from West Virginia. In the late seventeenth century they lived in the Kanawha Valley, near the Kanawha and New Rivers.

Name and language

What the Monetons called themselves is unknown. In the 1670s, Abraham Wood wrote their name "Moneton" and as another variant, "Monyton."

The eastern slopes of the southern Allegheny Mountains in Virginia are traditionally known as the Mahock. The Monetans are on the western rim of Tutelo and  "Monasuccapanough" Siouan language groups, as well as Iroquois dialects

Researchers have speculated that the Moneton language was part of the Siouan family, close to Tutelo.

History
James Mooney declared the Moneton lived in the western part of Colonial Virginia and said their name was an eastern Siouan word.  Some scholars suggest Monetons were part of the Monacan, with the different names being a consequence of variable colonial spelling.

The First Explorations of the Trans-Alleghany Region by the Virginians 1650–1674
The word Monetons is Siouan, though it may be Cherokee instead. The Mohetan told Batts and Fallam that their villages were about halfway between Peters' Mountain and the Ohio River. Hale and Mooney defines Siouan "Mon", "Ma" and "Man" as meaning a people's land. "Mone" has also been defined to mean water, and "ton" means large. Doctor Rankin observed that the Tutelo of Virginia have closer linguistic ties to the Crows of Montana than to the Catawbans of Carolina. A recent study of nine thousand pottery shards from Fort Ancient sites in the Kanawha and Ohio River valleys showed that thirty seven percent of them bore corncob impressions similar to those produced in the Siouan villages of Virginia between 1400 and 1600. Doctor Rankin concluded at the 2009 West Virginia Archaeology Annual Meeting that Siouan was probably spoken in the Kanawha Valley.

Using topographic maps, geographic landmarks and travel distances, Briceland demonstrates that Batts and Fallam reached Matewan on the Tug Fork. The islands near Logan resembles the falls of the James River near Wood's Fort in Virginia, though the gravel bar near Matewan, West Virginia does not resemble these early descriptions of the village's location of Batts and Fallam.

Other inhabitants of the area

Another tribe known as the Tomahittons has been also been reported in the Ohio Valley. The reports from the Mohetan given to Batts and Fallam regarding this tribe  correspond with reports from the Moneton to Arthur. Batts and Falla are credited as having discovered Kanawha Falls. Ouabano was a band of Mohicans or Eastern Lenape who lived within the region.  Earlier scholars have this site as found to be on Campbells Creek near Belle, West Virginia.

The Iroquois League, Huron Confederacy, and Conestoga(Andaste being a French word that was obtained via the Wendat)(Sultzman) are well reported as blocking the Nation du Chat from attaining fire arms. The Conestoga served as middlemen to the French and Dutch trade, and the Dutch provided the Conestoga with fire arms. Their neighbor to the east, in the Allegheny Mountains, were the Conestoga (English language or usage/Quaker for Andaste), also called Susquehannocks by Virginians. The Conestoga are first mentioned in the Voyages of Samuel Champlain for 1615, and he calls one of their some twenty villages "Carantouan". Carantouan was close to the New York and Pennsylvania border on the tributaries of the Susquehanna River on his map approaching towards the region from the Saint Lawrence Seaway. Grant County, West Virginia, Hampshire County, West Virginia and Hardy County, West Virginia as well as Allegany County, Maryland possess archaeological sites having Conestoga Ceramics. A Conestoga site is also located at Moorefield, West Virginia.

The tribes on the south eastern Allegheny Mountains of West Virginia in a region of the Blue Stone and Greenbrier river tributaries can be found in Batts and Fallows' September, 1671 Expedition. The records the arrival of the Les Tionontatacaga or Guyandotte, named for the Guyandotte River in Cabell County. This journal does not identify the "Salt Village" on the Kanawha, but, that the Mehetan were associated with these sites, and may not have been associated with sites further down the Ohio River.

Protohistory
  

Anthropologist James B. Griffin concluded in 1942 that no historical evidence existed to indicate that Siouan speaking tribes resided there. On the other hand, James Mooney, in a monograph surveying "The Siouan Tribes of the East," lists Mohetan as one of at least nine groups clearly Siouan.

"Calicuas" were reported at Cherokee Falls (Valley Falls) in 1705. Indian trader Charles Poke's trading post dates from 1731 with the remnant Calicuas of Cherokee Falls still in the region from the previous century. The Monetons may also be a distant Cherokee branch, partially evidenced by their antipathy for the Shawnees,), who were located on both sides of the Ohio in the vicinity of the mouth of the Scioto River.

Related Nations

 Akenatsi
 Catawba
 Cheraw
 Mosopelea
 Saponi
 Sewee
 Tutelo
 Waccamaw

See also
History of West Virginia
Prehistory of West Virginia
Protohistory of West Virginia
West Virginia Waterways

Notes

References
Demallie, Raymond J. "Tutelo and Neighboring Groups." Sturtevant, William C., general ed. Raymond D. Fogelson, volume ed. Handbook of North American Indians: Southeast. Volume 14. Washington DC: Smithsonian Institution, 2004. .

Algonquian ethnonyms
Extinct Native American tribes
Native American tribes in West Virginia
Pre-statehood history of West Virginia